The United States' Andre Agassi defeated Spain's Sergi Bruguera in the final, 6–2, 6–3, 6–1 to win the gold medal in Men's Singles tennis at the 1996 Summer Olympics. The victory gave Agassi the fourth of five components of the career Golden Slam; his later win at the French Open made him the first man to complete the career Golden Slam in singles. It was the United States' first gold medal in the event since 1924 and its third overall, equaling Great Britain's record. It was Spain's second consecutive silver medal. In the bronze medal match, India's Leander Paes defeated Brazil's Fernando Meligeni, 3–6, 6–2, 6–4. It was India's first Olympic tennis medal.

The tournament was held at the Stone Mountain Tennis Center in Atlanta, Georgia, of the United States of America. There were 64 competitors from 36 nations. Nations had been limited to three players each since the return of tennis to the Olympic program in 1988.

Switzerland's Marc Rosset was the reigning gold medalist from 1992, but he retired from his third round match against Renzo Furlan.

Background

This was the 10th (medal) appearance of the men's singles tennis event. The event has been held at every Summer Olympics where tennis has been on the program: from 1896 to 1924 and then from 1988 to the current program. Demonstration events were held in 1968 and 1984.

The number one seed was Andre Agassi of the United States. Two of the eight quarterfinalists from the 1992 tournament returned: gold medalist Marc Rosset of Switzerland and bronze medalist Goran Ivanišević of Croatia.

Armenia, the Czech Republic, Ecuador, Slovakia, Uruguay, Uzbekistan, and Venezuela each made their debut in the event. France made its ninth appearance, most among all nations, having missed only the 1904 event.

Competition format

The competition was a single-elimination tournament, but with some significant changes from 1988 and 1992. A bronze medal match was held, unlike the previous two Games. Matches before the final were reduced to best-of-three sets instead of best-of-five sets. The 12-point tie-breaker continued be used in any set, except the third (or the fifth in the final), that reached 6–6.

Schedule

All times are Eastern Daylight Time (UTC-4)

Seeds

Draw

Finals

Top half

Section 1

Section 2

Bottom half

Section 3

Section 4

References

 ITF Olympic Site

Men's singles
Men's events at the 1996 Summer Olympics